Nkore-Kiga is a language spoken by around 5,800,000 people living in the
extreme southwest of Uganda.  It is often defined as two separate languages: Nkore and Kiga.
It is closely related to Runyoro-Rutooro.

History 
Archibald Norman Tucker was the Linguistic Expert on Non-Arabic Languages for the government of Sudan and studied Bantu languages in Kenya and Uganda in the 1950s. In 1955, he determined that Nkore and Kiga were dialect variants of the same language and it was not long after that the Ugandan government made this new classification official.

There potentially were some political reasons for this reclassification because it was at around the same time that the Ugandan government abolished the Nkore Kingdom. Merging the two languages may have been one way the
government tried to ease the integration of the Nkore Kingdom into the rest of the country. By taking away their unique language the government gave them one less way to identify themselves as an independent entity.

Resources 
The main resource for Nkore-Kiga is a book written by Charles V. Taylor titled simply Nkore-Kiga.

See also 
 Runyakitara language

References 

Languages of Uganda
Nyoro-Ganda languages